Lelia Lake is an unincorporated community in central Donley County, Texas, United States.  It lies along U.S. Route 287 southeast of the city of Clarendon, the county seat of Donley County.  Its elevation is 2,592 feet (790 m).  Although Lelia Lake is unincorporated, it has a post office, with the ZIP code of 79240; the ZCTA for ZIP code 79240 had a population of 101 at the 2000 census.

Founded along the Fort Worth and Denver City Railway in the late 1880s, the community was named for the founder's sister.  When a post office was opened in the community in late 1906, the potential of confusion with the community of Lela in Wheeler County to the northeast led the post office to attach "Lake" to the community's name.  A school was established in the community in 1894.  Historically, Lelia Lake has been a center of grain traffic and of watermelon growing.

Notable residents
 Ace Reid, artist and humorist

References

External links
Community profile from the Handbook of Texas Online

Unincorporated communities in Donley County, Texas
Unincorporated communities in Texas